All Beauty Destroyed is the third album released by American electro-industrial band Aesthetic Perfection.  It was released on November 4, 2011 by Out of Line Records.

"The Devil's in the Details" and "Inhuman" were released as singles for the album, and music videos have been released for "Inhuman", "A Nice Place to Visit" and the title track, "All Beauty Destroyed".

On November 17, 2021, Daniel Graves announced on Aesthetic Perfection's Facebook page that the rights have been returned to him, following an agreement that elapsed a decade.

Track listing

References 

2011 albums
Metropolis Records albums